Julio Pena Fernández (born July 15, 2000) is a Spanish actor and singer who is known for his role as Manuel Gutiérrez Quemola in the Disney Channel original series Bia and Ares Hidalgo in the Netflix movie Through My Window, based on the book by Ariana Godoy.

Life and career 

Julio Peña was born on July 15, 2000, in San Sebastián, Spain. However, he grew up in the city of Madrid, along with his parents and his sister named Emma Peña. In high school he took theater lessons, and he attended acting workshops in the city. In addition, Peña took piano lessons for nine years.

Since 2012, he has been part of several plays, such as: The Nightmare Before Christmas (2012), Miles Gloriosus (2013), Spamolot (2014), Mamma Mia! (2015) and Los Pelópidas (2016), in addition to starring in the musicals Alice in Wonderland (2017), Corpse Bride (2018) and Moulin Rouge (2018) at the Arcadia Theater.

In 2018 he was selected to star in the Disney Channel original series Bia, with the role of Manuel Gutiérrez. He got the role when he was at the Jana theater school in Madrid and the producers of the series went to do a casting to select the actor. Although at first he was reluctant to do it, they hired him after passing the final tests, moving to Buenos Aires. Thanks to his performance, he has been nominated for the Kids' Choice Awards Mexico in 2020 as favorite television actor, to the Most Listened Awards in 2021 as actor of the year and the SEC Awards in Brazil as best actor in a teen series. In 2021 he participated in the television special Bia: A world upside down on Disney+. That same year he participated in the musical Something Rotten!, translated into Spanish by Marcos Árbex and premiered at the Arapiles Theater in Madrid.

In January 2021, he joined the Spanish television series Acacias 38, where he played Guillermo Sacristán until the end of it in May of the same year. In April 2021, his incorporation into the Netflix original film was announced. Through my window, based on the bestselling novel of the same name, where he plays Ares Hidalgo, the main protagonist. Months later, he participated in the music video for the song "Berlín" by Aitana, playing the love interest of Aitana (Miguel). He participated in the main cast of the play Embrague, written by Raúl Barranco and directed by Jacobo Muñoz.

Filmography

Awards and nominations

References 

Living people
2000 births
Spanish male television actors
21st-century Spanish singers
21st-century Spanish male actors
Male actors from the Basque Country (autonomous community)
People from San Sebastián
Male actors from Madrid
21st-century Spanish male singers